Guildford & Dorking United F.C. refers to the brief merger from 1974 to 1976 between the two English football clubs Dorking F.C. and Guildford United F.C. They played in the Southern Football League for only two seasons. Briefly giving Tier 5 football to the town of Dorking for the first time playing at Meadowbank. Tier 5 football was not resurrected until 2022-23 when Dorking Wanderers were promoted to the National League premier division.

Records
FA Cup
Fourth Qualifying Round 1974–75
FA Trophy
Second Qualifying Round 1975–76

References

Defunct football clubs in England
Defunct football clubs in Surrey
Sport in Guildford
Association football clubs established in 1974
Association football clubs disestablished in 1976
1974 establishments in England
1976 disestablishments in England